The Department of Politics and International Studies at the University of Cambridge (abbreviated POLIS) is the department at the University of Cambridge responsible for research and instruction in political science, international relations and public policy. It is part of the Faculty of Human, Social, and Political Science.

History
POLIS, formed in 2009 by the merger of the former Department of Politics and the Centre for International Studies, is administratively housed at the university's Alison Richard Building on the Sidgwick Site and is part of the Faculty of Human, Social, and Political Science. Its primary predecessor, the Department of Politics, was formed in 2004, prior to which political science had been fragmented across other departments. Notable teaching staff include Andrew Gamble, Peter Nolan, Brendan Simms, Marc Weller, Duncan Bell, Baroness Smith of Newnham and Ayşe Zarakol and current head of department Jude Browne.

Centres and programmes
Nine specialised programmes and research centres are housed within the department: the Centre of Governance and Human Rights, the Cambridge Centre for Political Thought, the Centre of Development Studies, the European Centre at POLIS, the Centre for Geopolitics, the Centre for Gender Studies, the Centre of South Asian Studies, the Centre of Latin American Studies, the Centre of African Studies, and including the Cambridge Review of International Affairs., the Bennett Institute for Public Policy and the El-Erian Institute of Behavioural Economics and Policy.

Degrees and reputation
POLIS grants a Bachelor of Arts degree in politics and international studies. At the postgraduate level, the department offers a Master of Philosophy (MPhil) degree in public policy, an MPhil degree in international relations and politics, a Master of Studies degree in international relations, and a Doctor of Philosophy degree in politics and international studies.

The 2022 edition of the Complete University Guide ranked the department second in its league table and the Guardian ranked Cambridge University third best in the UK for Politics. QS World University Rankings named the department the seventh best in the world in its subject area. The 2014 "Ivory Tower Survey", published by Foreign Policy, rated the department's master's programme 18th in the world for quality, and its doctoral programme 16th in the world. POLIS' master's degree programmes were ranked 16th in the world for study in international relations by The Christian Science Monitor.

References

External links
 

Politics and International Studies
Politics and International Studies, Department of